Security Forces Headquarters – Central (SFHQ-C) is a regional command of the Sri Lanka Army, that is responsible for the operational deployment and command all army units stationed in the Central and Southern parts of the island, this includes two divisions. The current Commander SFHQ-C is Major General M K S Silva RWP RSP ndu . The SFHQ-C is based at the Diyatalawa Garrison.

Although it is primary a command of the Sri Lanka Army it coordinates operations and deployments of ground units of the Navy, Air Force and police with that of the army in that area. Security Forces Headquarters – Central was formed splitting the Security Forces Headquarters – South which existed briefly.

Composition
 11 Infantry Division, Pallekele
 111 Infantry Brigade, Gampola
112 Infantry Brigade, Badulla
12 Division, Hambantota
121 Infantry Brigade,  Monaragala
122 Infantry Brigade, Weerawila

Previous Commanders Security Forces Headquarters  - Central 

 Maj Gen H C P Goonetilleke RSP USP ndc psc 
 Maj Gen U A B Medawela RSP USP ndu psc 
 Maj Gen A M Perera RWP RSP psc 
 Maj Gen A K S Perera WWV RWP RSP USP ndu
 Maj Gen A P de Z Wickramaratne RWP ndu psc 
 Maj Gen P U S Vithanage RSP ndu
 Maj Gen M K D Perera RWP RSP USP ndu
 Maj Gen G R H Dias VSV USP ndc psc  IG
 Maj Gen W R P De Silva USP ndu IG
Maj Gen G J L Waduge RWP RSP USP VSV ndu
Major General W D C K Costa RSP USP
Major General H P N K Jayapathirana RSP
Major General N R Lamahewage RWP RSP ndu
Major General H L V M Liyanage RWP RSP ndu

References

Commands of the Sri Lanka Army
Military headquarters in Sri Lanka